The 2000 NFL Europe season was the eighth season in 10 years of the American Football league that started out as the World League of American Football.

World Bowl 2000
Rhein 13-10 Scotland
Sunday, June 25, 2000 Waldstadion Frankfurt, Germany

References

 
2000 in American football
NFL Europe (WLAF) seasons